Fredrick Riebeling  (born 29 January 1953) is an Australian politician. He was a Labor member of the Western Australian Legislative Assembly from 1992 to 2008.

Riebeling was born in Bridgetown. Before becoming a member of parliament, he was a Roebourne shire president. He represented the electorate of Ashburton until it was abolished in 1994 and became part of the electorate of Burrup, which itself was later abolished in a redistribution in 2003 and became part of the electorate of North West Coastal. 
Riebeling was appointed as the Speaker of the Legislative Assembly in 2001.

He is married to Colleen Riebling and has three sons.

Riebeling retired shortly before the 2008 election and Vince Catania, the son of Balcatta MP Nick Catania, won preselection for the vacant seat and retained the seat for the Labor Party.

Riebeling is currently an elected member for the City of Mandurah after winning his 2011 WA local government election contest for a Coastal Ward seat.

In 2013, Riebeling stood against incumbent Liberal Kim Hames for the Electoral district of Dawesville in the 2013 state election, however was unsuccessful in his bid.

In 2019, Riebeling was appointed Commissioner of the Town of Port Hedland.

References 

1953 births
Living people
Members of the Western Australian Legislative Assembly
Speakers of the Western Australian Legislative Assembly
People from Bridgetown, Western Australia
Western Australian local councillors
Australian Labor Party members of the Parliament of Western Australia
21st-century Australian politicians
Members of the Order of Australia
Mayors of places in Western Australia